Official Language Act or Official Languages Act may refer to:

 the Official Languages Act (Canada) passed in Canada to enshrine official bilingualism
 the Official Language Act (Quebec) passed in Quebec to ensure that French retained its primary status
 the Official Languages Act (Ireland) passed in Ireland to promote the provision of state services in Irish
 Several acts passed in Sri Lanka:
 the Official Language Act No. 33 of 1956 (Ceylon), commonly known as the Sinhala Only Act, passed in Ceylon in 1956 to replacing English with Sinhala as the official language of the country
 the Tamil Language (Special Provisions) Act No. 28 of 1958 (Ceylon) passed in Ceylon in 1958 allows Tamil in education, public service entrance exams and administration in the Northern and Eastern provinces
 the Official Languages Act of 1987 (Sri Lanka) passed in Sri Lanka in 1987 to make Tamil an official language of the country
 the Official Languages Commission Act No. 18 of 1991 (Sri Lanka) passed in Sri Lanka in 1991 to establish the Official Languages Commission of Sri Lanka
 the Official Languages Ordinance passed in Hong Kong in 1974 to bring the English and Chinese languages to equal status as official languages of the territory
 the Official Languages Act (India) passed in 1963; see Official Languages Act